Animal Exploration with Jarod Miller is a documentary television series about a personal tour guide to the world of animals. The series is hosted by Jarod Miller, and was broadcast from September 24, 2007, to June 7, 2010.

Plot
Each episode follows Miller with a close-up of featured animals, with interviews and occasional visits to zoos and other places across the United States.

External links

Nature educational television series
2007 American television series debuts
2010 American television series endings
2000s American children's television series
2010s American children's television series
2000s American documentary television series
2010s American documentary television series
American children's education television series
Television series about mammals
Litton Entertainment
Qubo